The Pereschiv is a right tributary of the river Bârlad in Romania. It discharges into the Bârlad in Ghidigeni. Its source is near the village Șendrești. Lake Pereschiv is located on this river.

References

Rivers of Romania
Rivers of Bacău County
Rivers of Vrancea County
Rivers of Galați County